Zonguldak Çaycuma Airport  is an airport near the city of Zonguldak, in the western Black Sea region of Turkey. It is situated close to the town of Saltukova.

Airlines and destinations
The following airlines operate regular scheduled and charter flights at Zonguldak Airport:

Statistics

References

Airports in Turkey
Buildings and structures in Zonguldak Province
Transport in Zonguldak Province